Baiji District is a district of Saladin Governorate, Iraq.

Districts of Saladin Governorate